Nant Gwernol railway station is the eastern terminus of the Talyllyn Railway near  Abergynolwyn, Gwynedd in mid-Wales. Nant Gwernol station was opened in 1976; before 1976 this upper part of the line had only been used for goods services.

The station is built on the site of the former marshalling yard at the foot of the Alltwyllt incline, which was the first of the two inclines between the Talyllyn Railway and the Bryn Eglwys slate quarry. This site was chosen as the terminus of the passenger line, as it was the limit of locomotive working.

Trains only wait at the station long enough for the locomotive to run round, as there are no facilities at that point. Most trains pause at  station to allow passengers time for refreshments. There is no road access to the station, though several footpaths lead off up the incline or towards the road between Bryn-Eglwys and Abergynolwyn.

The station's name was taken from the nearby Nant Gwernol stream, and means "Alder Stream".

References

Talyllyn Railway Guide Book

External links

Heritage railway stations in Gwynedd
Railway stations in Great Britain opened in 1976
Talyllyn Railway stations
Railway stations in Great Britain without road access
Railway stations built for UK heritage railways
Abergynolwyn